Andreas Frivåg (12 August 1925 – 21 April 1991) is a Norwegian politician for the Socialist Left Party.

He served as a deputy representative to the Norwegian Parliament from Nordland during the term 1977–1981.

References

1925 births
1991 deaths
Socialist Left Party (Norway) politicians
Deputy members of the Storting
Nordland politicians